Light mast is a tall lighting specified mast, which has several big searchlights on top of it. Light masts illuminates large areas and are possible to move, which is why they are used (for example) as farming, construction and emergency works implement. The device works with its own electric generator or with external power source.

See also
Flag mast
Radio mast
Cell mast

External links

Lighting